National Highway 160, commonly referred to as NH 160 is a  national highway in India. It is a spur road of National Highway 60. NH-160 traverses the states of Maharashtra and Karnataka in India.

Route 
Maharashtra
Thane - Nashik -
Sinnar - Shirdi - Ahmednagar - Daund - Kurkumbh - Baramati - Phaltan - Dahiwadi - Mayani - Vita - Tasgaon - Miraj - Karnataka border.
Karnataka
Maharashtra border -Kagwad- Chikodi - Sankeshwar.

Junctions  

  Terminal Near Thane.

  Terminal Near Sinnar.

  near Kolhar.

  near Rahuri.

  near Ahmadnagar.

   near Kurkumbh.

   near Dahiwadi.

   near Mayani.

   near Vita.

   near Tasgaon.

   near Miraj - Sangli.

   near Miraj - Sangli.

   near Kagwad.

  Terminal near Sankeshwar - Gotur.

See also 
 Mumbai Nashik Expressway
 List of National Highways in India
 List of National Highways in India by state

References

External links 

 NH 160 on OpenStreetMap

National highways in India
National Highways in Maharashtra
National Highways in Karnataka
Transport in Nashik
Transport in Thane